Idactus flavovittatus is a species of beetle in the family Cerambycidae. It was described by Teocchi in 1986.

References

Ancylonotini
Beetles described in 1986